Mahbub Mansion, also spelt Mahboob Mansion is a palace, named after Mir Mahbub Ali Khan, Asaf Jah VI, the sixth Nizam, who loved visiting here occasionally, though his permanent residence was the Purani Haveli. It is located in the area Malakpet of Hyderabad.

History
Built in the late 19th century, this is a large palace in the architecture of classical European and Mughal style. It is similar to the eastern blocks of Mubarak Mansion Nazri Bagh of King Kothi Palace.

It was acquired by the Nizam in the 19th century.

Trivia 
Sardar Begum, a consort of Asaf Jah VI was fond of watching the races and used to watch them from the mansion amidst curtains made of gold thread. The sunlight reflected off the gold curtains made it impossible for anyone to look toward the queen, as per purdah.

Present day
In 1983, the spices market of Osman Gunj was officially shifted to the open land on Mahbub mansion.

The palace is abandoned and in very poor condition, completely neglected by the Government of India whereas, palace land has been entirely taken over by housing and commercial developments.

See also
 Nizam of Hyderabad
Mahbub Ali Khan, Asaf Jah VI

References

External links
 Exterior view of Mahbub Mansion on Youtube

Hyderabad State
Heritage structures in Hyderabad, India
Royal residences in India
Palaces in Hyderabad, India
Palaces of Nizams of Hyderabad